Maksim Vysotskiy (born 29 January 1995) is a Belarusian professional footballer who plays for Molodechno.

References

External links 
 
 

1995 births
Living people
Belarusian footballers
Association football goalkeepers
FC Minsk players
FC Torpedo Minsk players
FC Baranovichi players
FC Naftan Novopolotsk players
FC Dnepr Mogilev players
FC Gorodeya players
FC Khimik Svetlogorsk players
FC Smorgon players
FC Isloch Minsk Raion players
FC Belshina Bobruisk players
FC Molodechno players